Patrick Neal Dodson (born October 11, 1959) is a former first baseman with the Boston Red Sox from  to . He was drafted in 1980 by the Red Sox in the sixth round, 153rd pick overall out of UCLA. Dodson was a former International League MVP in the minor leagues, but was never able to produce at the major league level. His first major league hit came as a pinch hitter against the Twins on September 6, 1986.  His first MLB home run came on September 14, 1986 against Tim Stoddard. 

He is currently the Superintendent at Grove Public Schools in Grove, Oklahoma.

References

External links
, or Retrosheet, or Pura Pelota (Venezuelan Winter League)

1959 births
Living people
American expatriate baseball players in Japan
Baseball players from Santa Monica, California
Boston Red Sox players
International League MVP award winners
Major League Baseball first basemen
New Britain Red Sox players
Oklahoma City 89ers players
Osaka Kintetsu Buffaloes players
Pawtucket Red Sox players
Tiburones de La Guaira players
American expatriate baseball players in Venezuela
UCLA Bruins baseball players
University of California, Los Angeles alumni
Winter Haven Red Sox players
Alaska Goldpanners of Fairbanks players
Inglewood High School (California) alumni